Rodlek P.K. Saenchai Muaythaigym (born February 3, 1990), also known as Rodlek Jaotalaytong, is a Muay Thai fighter. He currently competes on ONE Championship. Rodlek is a former Channel 7 Boxing Stadium Champion.

Career
Rodlek had his first Muay Thai fight, which took place at a temple fair, at the age of 10. He lost that fight. The loss motivated him to commit to training in Muay Thai, his initial goal being to beat his opponent in a rematch. 

At the age of 12, he moved to the Jaotalaytong Gym. Upon finishing high school, Rodlek moved to Bangkok to build on his fighting career. It was in the country's capital where he also joined the Sitsongpeenong Gym, while also completing his bachelor's degree in management.     

Rodlek made his name in Muay Thai with his repeated successes at the famed Channel 7 Boxing Stadium. On April 24, 2016, he would become the Channel 7 130lb Champion with a win over Nuenglanlek Jitmuangnon. He did regularly fight at both Lumpinee Stadium and Rajadamnern Stadium but did not find the same success as he did at the Channel 7 Stadium. 

Rodlek made his ONE Championship debut at ONE Championship: Legendary Quest in Shanghai on June 15, 2019. In his first ONE fight, he defeated Liam Harrison by unanimous decision. He then faced Andrew Miller at ONE Championship: Dawn of Heroes in the Philippines on August 2, 2019, where he knocked out Miller in the third round.

Rodlek was scheduled to face Chris Shaw at ONE Championship: Fire & Fury on January 31, 2020. At Fire & Fury, he was able to knock down Shaw in the final seconds of the third round before claiming the unanimous decision victory.

Rodlek faced Saemapetch Fairtex in the ONE Bantamweight Muay Thai Tournament semi-final at ONE Championship: No Surrender II on August 14, 2020. Despite losing by majority decision, Rodlek advanced to the tournament final when it was revealed that Saemapetch had sustained an injury.

At ONE Championship: A New Breed on August 28, 2020, Rodlek faced Kulabdam Sor.Jor.Piek-U-Thai in the ONE Bantamweight Muay Thai Tournament final. He knocked down Kulabdam twice, once in the second round and another in the third round, to secure the unanimous decision win. With the victory, Rodlek will face Nong-O Gaiyanghadao for the ONE Bantamweight Muay Thai World Championship. He then challenged Nong-O for the title at ONE Championship: Collision Course on December 18, 2020, losing the bout via third-round knockout.

In April 2022, Rodlek joined Evolve MMA in Singapore to work as a trainer.

Titles and accomplishments

 World Professional Muaythai Federation
 2011 WPMF World 126lbs Champion

 Channel 7 Boxing Stadium  
 2016 Channel 7 Boxing Stadium 130 lbs Champion

Fight record

|- style="background:#FFBBBB;"
| 2021-10-29|| Loss ||align=left| Felipe Lobo || ONE Championship: NextGen III || Kallang, Singapore || Decision (Unanimous) || 3 || 3:00
|-  style="background:#FFBBBB;"
| 2020-12-18|| Loss ||align=left| Nong-O Gaiyanghadao || ONE Championship: Collision Course || Kallang, Singapore || KO (Right cross) || 3 || 1:12
|-
! style=background:white colspan=9 |
|-  style="background:#cfc;"
| 2020-08-28|| Win||align=left| Kulabdam Sor.Jor.Piek-U-Thai || ONE Championship: A New Breed || Bangkok, Thailand || Decision (Unanimous) || 3 || 3:00
|-  style="background:#FFBBBB;"
| 2020-07-31|| Loss ||align=left| Saemapetch Fairtex || ONE Championship: No Surrender 2 || Bangkok, Thailand || Decision (Majority) || 3 || 3:00
|-  bgcolor="#CCFFCC"
| 2020-01-31|| Win||align=left| Chris Shaw  || |ONE Championship: Fire & Fury || Pasay, Philippines || Decision (Unanimous) || 3 || 3:00
|-  bgcolor="#CCFFCC"
| 2019-08-02|| Win||align=left| Andrew Miller  || |ONE Championship: Dawn Of Heroes || Pasay, Philippines || KO (Punch) || 3 || 0:49
|-  bgcolor="#CCFFCC"
| 2019-06-15|| Win||align=left| Liam Harrison  || |ONE Championship: Legendary Quest || Shanghai, China || Decision (Unanimous) || 3 || 3:00
|-  style="background:#FFBBBB;"
| 2018-08-21|| Loss ||align=left| Phetmorakot Maekjandi  || Lumpinee Stadium || Bangkok, Thailand || Decision || 5 || 3:00
|-  style="background:#FFBBBB;"
| 2018-05-23|| Loss ||align=left| Rodtang Jitmuangnon || Rajadamnern Stadium  || Bangkok, Thailand || Decision || 5 || 3:00
|-  style="background:#FFBBBB;"
| 2018-04-28 || Loss ||align=left| Saeksan Or. Kwanmuang || Phoenix 7 Phuket, Patong Boxing Stadium || Phuket, Thailand || Decision || 5 ||3:00
|-
! style=background:white colspan=9 |
|-  style="background:#FFBBBB;"
| 2018-03-22|| Loss ||align=left| Mongkolkaew Sor.Sommai || Rajadamnern Stadium || Bangkok, Thailand || Decision || 5 || 3:00
|-  style="background:#FFBBBB;"
| 2018-02-08|| Loss ||align=left| Extra Sitworapat || Rajadamnern Stadium || Bangkok, Thailand || Decision || 5 || 3:00
|- style="background:#FFBBBB;"
| 2017-12-29 || Loss ||align=left| Nuenglanlek Jitmuangnon ||  || Thailand || Decision || 5 || 3:00
|-  style="background:#FFBBBB;"
| 2017-11-15|| Loss ||align=left| Yodlekpet Or. Pitisak || Rajadamnern Stadium || Bangkok, Thailand || Decision || 5 || 3:00
|-  style="background:#FFBBBB;"
| 2017-09-10|| Loss ||align=left|  Saeksan Or. Kwanmuang || Phetchbuncha Stadium || Ko Samui, Thailand || Decision || 5 || 3:00
|-  style="background:#CCFFCC;"
| 2017-04-01|| Win ||align=left| Genji Umeno || KNOCK OUT vol.2 || Tokyo, Japan || Decision || 5 || 3:00
|-  style="background:#CCFFCC;"
| 2017-02-22|| Win ||align=left| Saeksan Or. Kwanmuang ||Rajadamnern Stadium || Bangkok, Thailand || Decision || 5 || 3:00
|-  style="background:#FFBBBB;"
| 2016-12-09|| Loss ||align=left| Panpayak Jitmuangnon  || Lumpinee Stadium || Bangkok, Thailand || Decision || 5 || 3:00
|-  style="background:#FFBBBB;"
| 2016-09-30|| Loss ||align=left| Kaimukkao Por.Thairongruangkamai || Lumpinee Stadium || Bangkok, Thailand || Decision || 5 || 3:00
|-  style="background:#FFBBBB;"
| 2016-08-05|| Loss ||align=left| Saeksan Or. Kwanmuang || Kiatpetch Show || Hat Yai, Thailand || Decision || 5 || 3:00
|-  style="background:#CCFFCC;"
| 2016-06-03|| Win ||align=left| Saeksan Or. Kwanmuang ||Lumpinee Stadium || Bangkok, Thailand || Decision || 5 || 3:00
|-  style="background:#CCFFCC;"
| 2016-04-24 || Win ||align=left| Nuenglanlek Jitmuangnon || Channel 7 Boxing Stadium || Thailand || Decision || 5 || 3:00
|-
! style=background:white colspan=9 |
|-  style="background:#CCFFCC;"
| 2016-03-02 || Win ||align=left| Nuenglanlek Jitmuangnon || Rajadamnern Stadium || Thailand || TKO || 2 ||
|-  style="background:#CCFFCC;"
| 2016-01-24|| Win ||align=left| Yodlekpet Or. Pitisak || Samui Festival || Ko Samui, Thailand || Decision || 5 || 3:00
|-  style="background:#CCFFCC;"
| 2015-11-10|| Win ||align=left| Panpayak Sitchefboontham || Lumpinee Stadium || Bangkok, Thailand || Decision || 5 || 3:00
|-  style="background:#CCFFCC;"
| 2015-09-04|| Win ||align=left| Pokaew Fonjangchonburi || Lumpinee Stadium || Bangkok, Thailand || Decision || 5 || 3:00
|-  style="background:#CCFFCC;"
| 2015-07-29|| Win ||align=left| Thaksinlek Kiatniwat	 || Rajadamnern Stadium || Bangkok, Thailand || Decision || 5 || 3:00
|-  style="background:#FFBBBB;"
| 2015-05-01|| Loss ||align=left| Yok Parunchai ||  || Ko Samui, Thailand || Decision || 5 || 3:00
|-  style="background:#CCFFCC;"
| 2015-03-04|| Win ||align=left| Yokwitaya Phetsimean ||  || Nakhon Si Thammarat, Thailand || Decision || 5 || 3:00
|-  style="background:#CCFFCC;"
| 2014-12-28|| Win ||align=left| GrandPrixnoi Phetkiatphet|| Channel 7 Boxing Stadium || Bangkok, Thailand || Decision || 5 || 3:00
|-  style="background:#CCFFCC;"
| 2014-10-12|| Win ||align=left| Sirimongkol PK.Saenchaimuaythaigym || Channel 7 Boxing Stadium || Bangkok, Thailand || KO || 3 ||
|-  style="background:#FFBBBB;"
| 2014-09-05|| Loss ||align=left| Chalamtong Sitpanont  || Lumpinee Stadium || Bangkok, Thailand || KO || 3 ||
|-  style="background:#CCFFCC;"
| 2014-08-10|| Win ||align=left| Saemapetch Fairtex || Channel 7 Boxing Stadium || Bangkok, Thailand || Decision || 5 || 3:00
|-  style="background:#CCFFCC;"
| 2014-05-09|| Win ||align=left| Saksuriya Sathit-CD  ||  || Nakhon Si Thammarat, Thailand || KO (Right Overhand) || 2 ||
|-  style="background:#CCFFCC;"
| 2014-02-13|| Win ||align=left| Jenarong Tor Thaksin  ||  || Nakhon Si Thammarat, Thailand || Decision || 5 || 3:00
|-  style="background:#FFBBBB;"
| 2013-09-22|| Loss ||align=left| Tsunami Jor.Chaiwat || Channel 7 Boxing Stadium || Bangkok, Thailand || Decision || 5 || 3:00
|-  style="background:#CCFFCC;"
| 2012||Win ||align=left| Pornsanae Sitmonchai || || Thailand || KO (head kick)  ||  ||
|-  style="background:#CCFFCC;"
| 2011 || Win ||align=left|  Tuanpae Kiatkomsing  || Lumpinee Stadium || Bangkok, Thailand || Decision || 5 || 3:00
|-
! style=background:white colspan=9 |
|-
| colspan=9 | Legend:

References

1990 births
Rodlek P.K. Saenchaimuaythaigym
Living people
Rodlek P.K. Saenchaimuaythaigym
ONE Championship kickboxers